Tapajós Futebol Clube, usually known as Tapajós, is a Brazilian football team from the city of Santarém, Pará.

History
In 2014, shortly after their affiliation to the Pará Football Federation accepted, will play the second division of Campeonato Paraense.

In 2015, the team will play the main stage of the Campeonato Paraense for the first time in its history.

Honours
Campeonato Paraense Second Division
Winners (1): 2018

Runner-up: São Francisco

References

Football clubs in Pará
2012 establishments in Brazil